Isen may refer to:
Isen, Bavaria, a town in Germany
Isen, Kagoshima, a town in Japan
Isen (river) in Bavaria, Germany
The fictitious River Isen in Tolkien's literature
ISEN, a group of three French higher education establishments
Nissae Isen, actor
Tajja Isen, actor